Ismaïla N'Diaye (born January 22, 1988) is a Senegalese professional football player. He previously played in the Belgian Pro League for Cercle Brugge, and for Belgian side Kortrijk and Caen in France.

References

1988 births
Living people
Senegalese footballers
Stade Malherbe Caen players
K.V. Kortrijk players
Cercle Brugge K.S.V. players
Angoulême Charente FC players
Ligue 1 players
Ligue 2 players
Belgian Pro League players
Championnat National 3 players
Senegalese expatriate footballers
Expatriate footballers in France
Expatriate footballers in Belgium
Association football midfielders